The electoral district of Nunawading was an electoral district of the Legislative Assembly in the Australian state of Victoria, located in the eastern Melbourne suburb of Nunawading. A notable former member was future Prime Minister, Robert Menzies.

It was abolished in 1945, replaced by Box Hill.

Members for Nunawading

Election results

References

Former electoral districts of Victoria (Australia)
1927 establishments in Australia
1945 disestablishments in Australia